Svealand, or Swealand, is the historical core region of Sweden. It is located in south central Sweden and is one of three historical lands of Sweden, bounded to the north by Norrland and to the south by Götaland. Deep forests, Tiveden, Tylöskog, and Kolmården, separated Svealand from Götaland. Historically, its inhabitants were called , from which is derived the English 'Swedes'.

Svealand consists of the capital region Mälardalen in the east, Roslagen in the north-east, the former mining district Bergslagen in the center, and Dalarna and Värmland in the west.

The older name of Sweden in Swedish,  Realm of the Swedes, "Swea Region", originally only referred to Svealand. As the domains of the Swedish kings grew, the name Svealand began to be used to separate the original territory from the new.

Provinces 
Svealand is made up of the following six provinces:

Dalarna
Närke
Södermanland
Uppland
Värmland
Västmanland

Stockholm, the Swedish capital, is located in both Uppland and Södermanland, and  a border stone can be found in the street  in Stockholm Old Town.

Counties 

Since 1634, Sweden has been divided into counties instead of provinces (see Län). Although Svealand is defined in terms of the historical provinces and not the counties, it roughly comprises the modern counties of Dalarna, Örebro, Södermanland, Stockholm, Uppsala, Värmland and Västmanland.

History 
Svealand was the original Sweden, to which it gave its name. This is supported by linguistics and is based on early medieval sources, such as the sagas. In Old Norse and in Old English, Svealand and Sweden are synonymous, and described as a separate country from Götaland/Gautland/Geatland. 
In Sögubrot af Nokkrum for instance, Kolmården between Svealand and Östergötland is described as the border between Sweden and Östergötland.
In Hervarar saga, king Ingold I rides to Sweden through Östergötland: .
 is mentioned in the travels of Ohthere of Hålogaland around 890.
The lord Bo Jonsson Grip was probably the one who was best acquainted with the geography of the Swedish kingdom since he owned more than half of it. Svealand),  (i.e. Götaland).
The 15th-century Swedish version of the  says that  was formerly a name for Sweden (Swerige) and Götaland: .

In the early Middle Ages the modern province of Gästrikland was part of Tiundaland, one of the three constituent parts of the modern province of Uppland, and therefore counted as a part of Svealand.

For a time in the early 19th century, the province of Värmland  belonged to the Court of Appeal for Svealand. Even though Värmland historically belonged to Götaland (from 1815 until a new court, Court of Appeal for Western Sweden, was instituted), it has by custom long been considered part of Svealand.

See also 
 Norrland terrain
 Central Swedish lowland
 Österland
 Rike

References

External links

 
Lands of Sweden